Terry Lee Roberts, Ph.D (born July 30, 1956) is an American educator and novelist. He has written extensively about American public education, specifically the teaching of critical and creative thinking via Socratic discussion. He is also the author of five novels, most of which flow out of his heritage in southern Appalachia.
He lives in Asheville, North Carolina with his wife, Lynn.

Early life and education
Roberts was born in Asheville, North Carolina in 1956 and lived near the small mountain town of Weaverville. He went to local public schools and earned degrees from the University of North Carolina at Asheville (BA), Duke University (MAT), and the University of North Carolina at Chapel Hill (PhD). His family has lived in the mountains of Western North Carolina since the American Revolutionary War, farming in Madison County, North Carolina along the French Broad River. The town of Hot Springs in Madison county is a setting in his novels.

Career
After earning an MAT from Duke University in 1979, Roberts taught high school English for nine years before returning to graduate school at the University of North Carolina at Chapel Hill, where he earned a PhD with a dissertation on the fiction of Elizabeth Spencer.
He is also a scholar of John Ehle and Thomas Wolfe.

Since 1992, he has served as Director of the National Paideia Center, an educational reform institute devoted to creating schools that are both more rigorous and more equitable. During his time at the Paideia Center, Roberts has served as a consultant on the role of socratic seminar dialogue in the classroom, educational leadership and organizational development. He has written extensively about classroom instruction and, increasingly, about teaching critical and creative thinking in the context of an expanded definition of literacy.

Around 2005, Roberts began to write fiction inspired by the power of the past among people living in the southern Appalachian mountains. His first novel, A Short Time to Stay Here, is set in the mountain community of Hot Springs, North Carolina, during World War I at the time that an internment camp of German detainees was established there, and focuses on the intersection of cultures. A Short Time to Stay Here won the Willie Morris Award for Southern Fiction, and the Sir Walter Raleigh Award for Fiction given annually for the best novel by a North Carolinian. His second, That Bright Land, is set just after the Civil War, and focuses on the deep divisions within a community struggling to recover from the war. It won the Thomas Wolfe Memorial Literary Award and the James Still Award for Writing about the Appalachian South. His third novel is The Holy Ghost Speakeasy and Revival. His fourth is My Mistress' Eyes Are Raven Black, a thriller set on Ellis Island in 1920. It was a 2022 International Thriller Writers Awards finalist in the Best Paperback Original category. Terry Roberts' fifth novel, published in July 2022, is "The Sky Club", a novel set in Asheville, North Carolina in the late 1920s and early 1930s at the time of the financial crash.

In 2019, Roberts was elected to membership in the North Caroliniana Society for his contributions to North Carolina's heritage. The same year, he was appointed President of the Thomas Wolfe Society, an association of scholars of the writer Thomas Wolfe. In 2021, Roberts was named a Director of the North Caroliniana Society.

Awards
 2012. Willie Morris Award for Southern Fiction for A Short Time to Stay Here.
 2013. Sir Walter Raleigh Award for fiction for A Short Time to Stay Here.
 2016. Thomas Wolfe Memorial Literary Award for That Bright Land.
 2016. Sir Walter Raleigh Award for fiction for That Bright Land.
 2017. James Still Award for Writing about the American South for That Bright Land.

Publications

Novels

 (paperback).
 (paperback).
 (paperback).

Literary Criticism

Education

 (paperback).
 (hardcover).

 (paperback).

Articles

References

Living people
1956 births
American educators
American male novelists
20th-century American novelists
20th-century American male writers
21st-century American novelists
21st-century American male writers
Writers from Asheville, North Carolina
People from Asheville, North Carolina
University of North Carolina at Asheville alumni
Duke University alumni
University of North Carolina at Chapel Hill alumni